Outer Brass is an island of the United States Virgin Islands, located off of Nordside, St. Thomas.

References 

Islands of the United States Virgin Islands
Northside, Saint Thomas, U.S. Virgin Islands